Üç Kuruş is a Turkish action, comedy drama and crime television series, made by Ay Yapım, directed by Sinan Öztürk, written by Damla Serim, Eset Akçilad and Murat Uyurkulak, the first episode of which was broadcast on November 1, 2021. The leading roles are shared by Uraz Kaygılaroğlu, Ekin Koç, Aslıhan Malbora and Diren Polatoğulları.

Plot 
A serial killer (Diren Polatoğulları) is stalking Çıngıraklı, a tight-knit Roman neighborhood with little regard for outsiders. He leaves three pennies on each of his victims’ body, and the case is assigned to the Organized Crime Unit. Its captain, Efe (Ekin Koç), initially suspects Kartal (Uraz Kaygılaroğlu), a Romani mafia leader who is the neighborhood “protector” and Efe’s target. However, as Efe realizes that Kartal is not the killer, the cop and the mafia leader form an uneasy alliance to find Çıngıraklı’s “Three Penny serial Killer.”

Efe has always looked at Kartal’s neighborhood as a breeding ground for criminals and lowlifes, but this case helps him see through the Romani perspective. The unexpected connection between the Three Penny serial Killer and Kartal’s tragic past will call into question everything he believes.

Filming 
While the series was shot in the Balat district of the Fatih district of Istanbul and the Çayırbaşı district of the Sarıyer district, some scenes take place in the old shoe factory in Beykoz.

Cast and characters

Main characters 

 Kartal Çaka (Uraz Kaygılaroğlu): The leader of the Çıngıraklı neighbourhood. He killed Nezih, Korkmaz, Baybars and Kılıç. He was husband of Bahar.
 Efe Tekin (Ekin Koç): Police officer who's aim is to put Kartal in jail but falls in love with his sister instead. He is husband of Leyla.
 İrfan Kahraman\Ferhan Şensoy  (Diren Polatoğulları): A serial killer who worked as musician at night. He sees Kartal as his brother. He was shot and killed by Efe.
 Bahar Yöndel Çaka (Nesrin Cavadzade): Nezih Yöndel's daughter. Wife of Kartal. She was killed by Baybars. 
 Leyla Çaka Tekin (Aslıhan Malbora): Kartal's sister. She is wife of Efe.
 Neriman Çaka (Nursel Köse): Kartal's aunt. Killed by Kılıç.
 Oktay Çaka (Civan Canova): Kartal's father. He lost his right arm because of Baybars in 1997.
 Nezih Yöndel (Zafer Algöz): Bahar's father. He was working for Baybars. He was shot and killed by Kartal.
 Baybars (Kadir Çermik): Mafia leader. He killed İrfan / Ferhan's mother and cut Oktay's arm in 1997. He was killed by Kartal.
 Azade (Sezin Akbaşoğulları): Crime leader. She was working for Baybars. She drank a cup of poisonous coffee that was prepared by Şahin. Afterwards, she slept and died.
 Mesut (Cenk Kangöz): Kartal’s ex enemy and his ally, used to work for Nezih. He was killed by Baybars' men. 
 Şesu (Uğur Yıldıran): One of the Kartal’s closest friends.
 Şahin (Umutcan Ütebay): Kartal’s brother. He used to work for Baybars. But when Kılıç killed Neriman, he became Kılıç's and Baybars' enemy.
 Ruşen (Mustafa Kırantepe): Kartal’s close friend.
 Konyalı (Berk) (Alişan Uğur): A professional hacker. He was addicted to drug but thanks to Kartal, he left using drug. After Kartal went to jail, Konyalı started using drug again.
 Halide Çaka  (Damla Makar): Kartal, Leyla and Şahin's niece.
 Çetin (Bora Akkaş): Baybars' son and enemy. Kılıç's younger brother. Kartal's cousin.
Kılıç Hicaz (Necip Memili): Baybars' son. Çetin's elder brother. He killed Neriman. He was choked by Kartal in jail and he died.
Korkmaz (Mehmet Bozdoğan): Mafia leader. He was working for Baybars. Efe killed Korkmaz's brother Can but Kartal took the blame. So, Korkmaz shot Kartal's father Oktay and avenged his brother Can. After three years, Kartal trapped Korkmaz and killed him.
Bahar Tekin (Elisa Akar):Efe and Leyla's daughter.

Songs

Overview
</onlyinclude>

Episodes

Season 1 (2021–2022) 
</onlyinclude>

References

External links 
 Üç Kuruş on official website of Show TV
 

2021 Turkish television series debuts
Turkish drama television series
Television series by Ay Yapım
Television shows set in Istanbul